Raiguer is a comarca (county) located in the north-central part of Majorca, one of the Balearic Islands of Spain. It runs parallel to the Serra de Tramuntana district from the town of Marratxí to the town of Sa Pobla. Like the rest of the Majorcan districts, it is only recognized at a geographic level.

Raiguer includes the following municipalities: 
 Alaró
 Alcúdia
 Binissalem
 Búger
 Campanet
 Consell
 Inca
 Lloseta
 Mancor de la Vall
 Marratxí
 Sa Pobla
 Santa Maria del Camí
 Selva

External links
District of Raiguer

Comarcas of the Balearic Islands